Trichosporonosis is a systemic disease associated with fungi in the genus Trichosporon.

It can appear in patients who are immunosuppressed.

References

External links 

Tremellomycetes
Animal fungal diseases
Fungi and humans
Mycosis-related cutaneous conditions